The Pine Gulch Fire was a wildfire that burned in Mesa County and Garfield County, Colorado in the United States. The fire was started by a lightning strike and first reported on July 31, 2020 and quickly grew, resulting in the fire being named the largest wildfire in Colorado history, surpassing the 2002 Hayman Fire. Almost seven weeks later, it was surpassed by the Cameron Peak Fire in Larimer County.

The Pine Gulch Fire burned on private and public lands and threatened gas and oil drilling infrastructure. The fire resulted in the closure of highways, government-managed and recreational land, and the evacuation of rural residences in the fire zone. The fire was declared 100% contained on September 23, and all evacuation orders were lifted. In total, the fire burned .

Events

July

The Pine Gulch Fire was first reported on July 31, 2020, around 5:15 PM, in a remote area of Bureau of Land Management (BLM) land in Mesa County, Colorado, approximately eighteen miles north of Grand Junction. Started by a lightning strike, the fire spread rapidly, fueled by hot weather, steep terrain, and drought stricken grass, sage, pinyon and fir.

August

Fire crews had were only able to reach the fire area by foot, to build control lines, with the support of helicopters and planes dumping water and retardant. The next day, on August 2, the fire had grown spread north, burning on private land along a road. Mesa County Rd. X 1/2 after High Lonesome Ranch were closed.

The fire continued to grow, threatening oil and gas drilling infrastructure. A temporary flight restriction was put in place for the fire area on August 4. The fire began burning northwards onto Horse Mountain. Air quality began to decline and an Air Quality Health Advisory was put in place for northern Mesa County and southwestern Garfield County. Red Flag Warnings were put in place on the 6th and additional road closures were put in place. Smoke began to impact De Beque, Colorado and areas along Interstate 70.

The fire had moved down Forshay Gulch on the north side of Horse Mountain, before eventually spreading to Lion and Bledsaw Gulches and along 200 Rd. The fires continued growth resulted in evacuation warnings being put in place for residents in rural, western Garfield County and a small group of homes were evacuated along County Roads 200 and 202. On August 9, evacuations were put in place for more residences in the area.

A red flag warning was put into place on August 11 and the fire was seven percent contained. The fire began burning in closer to Roan Creek and on the south slope of Kimball Mountain. On August 15, the fire burned onto Garfield Mesa and additional road closures were put in place. The air quality was impacted in Craig and Meeker.

The fire moved north of Fruita, resulting in more road closures. Air tankers began providing support, dumping retardant to slow the fire's spread. On August 18, residents on a portion of Roan Creek Rd were allowed to return to their homes. An evacuation warning was put in place for areas of County Road 205, Kimball Mountain Rd and County Road 256. A thunderstorm moved through the western flank and caused wind gusts up to 40 MPH in near Echo Lake, resulting in firefighters having to evacuate the area due to the fire's erratic behavior and fast spread. This caused the fire to grow to an estimated .

By August 24, the Pine Gulch Fire was 44 percent contained. Two days later, on August 26, Highway 139 reopened. The next day, suppression repair began. A flash flood warning was announced for the eastern portion of the fire due to forecasted thunderstorms. A small debris flow took place near Kimball Creek Rd. On August 28, the fire had burned  and was named the largest wildfire in Colorado history. The fire was 77 percent contained. Evacuation warnings were lifted for all areas west of Highway 139 to the Utah border and BLM closures were reduced.

September
On September 1, all evacuation orders were lifted.
As of September 3, the fire had burned  and was 83 percent contained. By September 9, the fire was 95 percent contained.

Impact
The Pine Gulch Fire resulted in the evacuation of residences, including along Roan Creek (CR 204) Rd. Numerous county roads were closed, as well as a portion of Highway 139.

The Pine Gulch Fire impacted recreation, transportation, and energy infrastructure in the area. The fire resulted in the closure of roads. The fire threatened oil drills and gas wells. This resulted in gas wells being stopped from collecting gas on August 2 and fire crews implementing defensible space around them.

The fire impacted air quality in Garfield, Moffat, Mesa and Rio Blanco Counties, including the communities of Craig and Meeker.

Firefighters sustained minor injuries.

Gallery

See also 

 Grizzly Creek Fire
 List of Colorado wildfires

References

Sources

Footnotes

Wildfires in Colorado
2020 Colorado wildfires
Mesa County, Colorado
July 2020 events in the United States
August 2020 events in the United States
Garfield County, Colorado